Tur'an is a local council in the Northern District of Israel.

History

Iron Age 
Pottery and building remains from the Iron Age I have been excavated in the northwestern part of the village. Apparently Tur'an was at that time (10–9th centuries BCE) surrounded by a city wall. Apparently it was of a considerable size in the late tenth to the mid-ninth centuries BCE.  The massive  wall, (width c. 2.4 m), probably enclosed an area of about 25 dunams, and has frm pottery remains been dated to Iron Age IIA (ninth century BCE).

The PEF's Survey of Western Palestine (SWP) found caves and rock-cut cisterns in the village, which they noted appeared to be  an ancient site.

Classical Antiquity and Middle Ages 
The village was known in the Roman and Byzantine periods (Mishnaic and Talmudic times, respectively) as Tir'an. It was a Jewish village.

Pottery from the early Islamic (7th century CE), and Mamluk (14th century CE) have been excavated in the village centre, near the old mosque, together with building remains from the same period.

Ottoman era
It had a population of 48 households, all Muslim. They paid a fixed tax rate of 25%  on agricultural products, including wheat, barley, olive trees, fruit trees,  goats and/or beehives; a total of 5,410 akçe.

A map from Napoleon's invasion of 1799 by Pierre Jacotin  showed the place, though misplaced, named as Touran.

In 1838, it was noted as a large Muslim, Catholic Christian and Greek Christian village in the Nazareth district.

In 1848, William F. Lynch described Tur'an as "quite a fortification."
The French explorer Victor Guérin visited Tur'an in 1870, and estimated it had 350 Muslims and 200 "Greeks".
In 1881, the PEF's Survey of Western Palestine (SWP) described it  as  "A stone village, partly built of basalt, containing about 300 inhabitants, half  Christian, half Moslem.[..]  The village is situated al the foot of the hills, and is surrounded by groves of olives. There is a good spring to the north-west."

A population list from about 1887 showed that  Tor'an had about  600 inhabitants; mixed Christians and  Muslims.

British Mandate era
In the  1922 census of Palestine conducted  by the British Mandate authorities, Tur'an had a population of 768; 542 Muslims and 226 Christians.  Of the Christians, 52 were Orthodox and 174 were Melkite.  The population had increased in the 1931 census to 961;  693  Muslims and 268 Christians, in a total of 188 occupied houses.

In the 1945 statistics the population was 1,350; 1,010 Muslims and 340 Christians, with 29,743  dunams of land, according to an official land and population survey. Of this, 1,153 dunams were for plantations and irrigable land, 11,909 for cereals, while 34 dunams were built-up land.

State of Israel
On 18 July 1948 the Israeli captured Tur'an during the second part of Operation Dekel. The houses of those villagers who fled were later used to house Arab refugees from neighbouring villages. The village remained under Martial Law until 1966.

See also
Arab localities in Israel

References

Bibliography

External links
Official website 
Welcome To Tur'an
Survey of Western Palestine, Map 6:  IAA, Wikimedia commons 

Arab localities in Israel
Arab Christian communities in Israel
Local councils in Northern District (Israel)
Ancient Jewish settlements of Galilee